Thirlmere is a small semi-rural town in the Macarthur Region of New South Wales, Australia, in Wollondilly Shire. Popularly known for its railway origins, the town is located 89 km south west of Sydney (about a 60-minute drive), one third of the distance from Sydney to Canberra.

Thirlmere was previously known as Village of Thirlmere and was originally named after Thirlmere in England.

History
The Thirlmere area was first explored by the British in 1798, whose attention was focussed more on the Thirlmere Lakes area and finding an alternate route north towards Bathurst.

Thirlmere boomed with the creation of the Great Southern Railway in 1863 to 1867, when the area was blanketed in tents to house the many railway workers that came to the area to work. Thirlmere was valued mostly for the proximity of the Thirlmere Lakes (then called Picton Lakes) which were used to provide water for the steam trains. During this period Thirlmere was also the home for a number of timber mills, whose main product was the milling of sleepers for the railway line.

The Thirlmere section of the Main Southern Railway was deviated in 1919 to a less steep alignment with easier grades, and the original line became the Picton Loop Line. This transformed the village from a hive of steam train activity to a quiet farming region, mainly supplying the surrounding villages with foods and goods.

Many Estonian immigrants settled in Thirlmere from 1924 onwards, especially after the Second World War. Tens of thousands fled Soviet occupied Estonia to avoid being sent to Siberia in order to quell resistance and weaken national identity. Estonians are largely responsible for the development of the successful poultry industry, which at one stage was the largest egg producer in the state and still provides the great majority of NSW's poultry produce. Many of the younger generations of Estonians have left the area and moved closer to the city but other original immigrants and newcomers live there, in Australia's only Estonian Retirement Village.

In the 1960s and 1970s nearby coal mines provided a boost in employment and also drew more people into the area to work and live. A few coal mines are still operating today but these do not employ as many people as they once did.

Heritage listings 
Thirlmere has a number of heritage-listed sites, including:
 NSW Rail Transport Museum Barbour Road: Rail Paybus FP1

Demographics
The  showed Thirlmere's population to be 4,046, with a gender split of 49.3% males to 50.7% females. 79.5% of the population is Australian born, 4.5% born in England, 1.0% in New Zealand, 1.0% in Estonia, 0.8% in Scotland and 0.7% Lebanon. The most common ancestries in Thirlmere were Australian 33.9%, English 31.0%, Estonian 7.1%, Scottish 5.9% and German 2.6%.

The median age of people in Thirlmere was 40 years. Children aged 0–14 years made up 20.0% of the population. People aged 65 years and over made up 19.3% of the population. 29.2% of people were attending an educational institution. Of these, 32.1% were in primary school, 22.2% in secondary school and 14.7% in a tertiary or technical institution.

Environment
The area's highest recorded temperature is 42.8 °C. Its lowest recorded temperature is -10.0 °C. The area receives an average of 812.6mm of annual rainfall. The highest recorded rainfall was 245.9mm in one day. The area, part of Sydney's water catchment area, experiences most of its rainfall from January to March.

Thirlmere Lakes National Park is an important environmental area - it is a series of lakes which have a sandstone bed. The lakes area is generally sheltered, providing an ideal home to many freshwater inhabitants such as platypuses, mussels, jellyfish, and a wide variety of water birds. The parks is also host to a significant wombat population.

The area's dense bushland surroundings make the town vulnerable to bushfires, with fires destroying a house in 2006.

Attractions

NSW Rail Museum

The NSW Rail Museum is Australia's largest and oldest railway museum with over 125 railway exhibits.  It is the home to many steam and diesel locomotives, the most popular of which is the famous 3801. Steam train rides are available on Sundays during the winter months, to avoid the risk of bushfire in this rural area.

Each year on the first Sunday in March, the town's population grows to over 15,000 as tourists flock to the "Thirlmere Festival of Steam" - NSW's premier annual steam event featuring the state's biggest gathering of main-line steam locos and all the fun of the fair and markets.

The museum also operates excursion trains from Sydney to Thirlmere hauled by steam and/or diesel locomotives.

Thirlmere Lakes National Park

As well as being an important environment ecosystem, Thirlmere Lakes (managed by the NSW Parks & Wildlife Service) is a popular picnic spot for locals and day trippers from Sydney, who take advantage of the free electric barbecues. Covering an area of 627 hectares (1,550 acres), there are several sand beaches, with the lakes (with a maximum depth of 6m) being popular for kayaking and canoeing.  Thirlmere Lakes was also a popular location for locals to swim.

There are a few bush walking trails with the longest being a 16 km return trip.  Camping is not allowed.

Film and television
Due to the easy access to working steam trains, Thirlmere has been the scene for a number of television commercials and television shows.

Perhaps the most popular television series filmed at Thirlmere was the Channel Seven series Always Greener, from 2001 to 2003. This prominently featured the main street of Thirlmere, including many shots of the pub, local stores, railway station, and surrounding countryside.

Gallery

See also
 Campbelltown, New South Wales
 Estonian Australian

References

Bibliography
 Bayley, W. A. 1975. Picton-Mittagong Main Line Railway.  Bulli: Austrail. 
 Bayley, W. A. 1973. Picton-Mittagong Loop-Line Railway.  Bulli: Austrail.

External links

 
Towns in New South Wales
Towns in the Macarthur (New South Wales)
Wollondilly Shire
Estonian diaspora